The following is a partial list of Intel CPU microarchitectures. The list is incomplete. Additional details can be found in Intel's Tick–tock model and Process–architecture–optimization model.

x86 microarchitectures

16-bit 
 8086 first x86 processor; initially a temporary substitute for the iAPX 432 to compete with Motorola, Zilog, and National Semiconductor and to top the successful Z80. 8088 version, with an 8-bit bus, used in the original IBM Personal Computer.
 186 included a DMA controller, interrupt controller, timers, and chip select logic. A small number of additional instructions.  The 80188 was a version with an 8-bit bus.
 286 first x86 processor with protected mode including segmentation based virtual memory management. Performance improved by a factor of 3 to 4 over 8086. Included instructions relating to protected mode.

32-bit (IA-32) 
 i386 first 32-bit x86 processor. Introduced paging on top of segmentation which is the most commonly used memory protection technology in modern operating systems ever since. Many additional powerful and valuable new instructions.
 i486 Intel's second generation of 32-bit x86 processors, introduced built-in floating point unit (FPU), 8 KB on-chip L1 cache, and pipelining. Faster per MHz than the 386. Small number of new instructions.
 P5 original Pentium microprocessors, first x86 processor with super-scalar architecture and branch prediction.
 P6 used in Pentium Pro, Pentium II, Pentium II Xeon, Pentium III, and Pentium III Xeon microprocessors. First x86 processor to support SIMD instruction with XMM register implemented, RISC μop decode scheme, integrated register renaming and out-of-order execution. Some important new instructions, including conditional moves, which allow the avoidance of costly branch instructions. Added 36-bit physical memory addressing, "Physical Address Extension (PAE)".
 Pentium M: updated version of Pentium III's P6 microarchitecture designed from the ground up for mobile computing and first x86 to support micro-op fusion and smart cache.
 Enhanced Pentium M: updated, dual core version of the Pentium M microarchitecture used in the first Intel Core microprocessors, first x86 to have shadow register architecture and speed step technology.
 NetBurstcommonly referred to as P7 although its internal name was P68 (P7 was used for Itanium). Used in Pentium 4, Pentium D, and some Xeon microprocessors. Very long pipeline. The Prescott was a major architectural revision. Later revisions were the first to feature Intel's x86-64 architecture, enhanced branch prediction and trace cache, and eventually support was added for the NX (No eXecute) bit to implement executable-space protection.

64-bit (x86-64) 
 Core reengineered P6-based microarchitecture used in Intel Core 2 and Xeon microprocessors, built on a 65 nm process, supporting x86-64 level SSE instruction and macro-op fusion and enhanced micro-op fusion with a wider front end and decoder, larger out-of-order core and renamed register, support loop stream detector and large shadow register file.
 Penryn: 45 nm shrink of the Core microarchitecture with larger cache, higher FSB and clock speeds, SSE4.1 instructions, support for XOP and F/SAVE and F/STORE instructions, enhanced register alias table and larger integer register file.
 Nehalem released November 17, 2008, built on a 45 nm process and used in the Core i7, Core i5, Core i3 microprocessors. Incorporates the memory controller into the CPU die. Added important powerful new instructions, SSE4.2.
 Westmere: 32 nm shrink of the Nehalem microarchitecture with several new features.

 Sandy Bridge32 nm microarchitecture, released January 9, 2011. Formerly called Gesher but renamed in 2007. First x86 to introduce 256 bit AVX instruction set and implementation of YMM registers.
 Ivy Bridge: successor to Sandy Bridge, using 22 nm process, released in April 2012.
 Haswell 22 nm microarchitecture, released June 3, 2013. Added a number of new instructions, including AVX2 and FMA.
 Broadwell: 14 nm derivative of the Haswell microarchitecture, released in September 2014. Three-cycle FMUL latency, 64 entry scheduler. Formerly called Rockwell.
 Skylake14 nm microarchitecture, released August 5, 2015.
 Kaby Lake: successor to Skylake, released in August 2016, broke Intel's Tick-Tock schedule due to delays with the 10 nm process.
 Amber Lake: ultra low power, mobile-only successor to Kaby Lake, using 14+ nm process, released in August 2018 (no architecture changes)
 Whiskey Lake: mobile-only successor to Kaby Lake Refresh, using 14++ nm process, released in August 2018 (has hardware mitigations for some vulnerabilities)
 Skylake-X: high-end desktop, workstation and server microarchitecture, released on June 19, 2017 (HEDT), July 11, 2017 (SP) and August 29, 2017 (W). Introduces support for AVX-512 instruction set.
 Coffee Lake: successor to Kaby Lake, using 14++ nm process, released in October 2017
 Cascade Lake: server and high-end desktop successor to Kaby Lake-X and Skylake-X, using 14++ nm process, released in April 2019
 Comet Lake: successor to Coffee Lake, using 14++ nm process, released in August 2019
 Cooper Lake: server-only, optimized for AI oriented workloads using bfloat16, with limited availability only to Intel priority partners, using 14++ nm process, released in 2020

 Palm Cove After releasing the Palm Cove core, Intel has changed their microarchitecture naming scheme, decoupling the CPU cores from their manufacturing nodes.Successor to Skylake (canceled), includes the AVX-512 instruction set.
 Cannon Lake: mobile-only successor of Kaby Lake, using Intel's 10 nm process, first and only microarchitecture to implement the Palm Cove core, released in May 2018. Formerly called Skymont, discontinued in December 2019.
 Sunny CoveSuccessor to the Palm Cove core, first non-Atom core to include hardware acceleration for SHA hashing algorithms.
 Ice Lake: low power, mobile-only successor to Whiskey Lake, using 10 nm process, released in September 2019
 Lakefield: mobile-only, Intel's first hybrid processor, released in June 2020. Sunny Cove is used in the singular performance core (P-core) of Lakefield processors. AVX and more advanced instruction sets are disabled due to the E-core not supporting them.
 Ice Lake-SP: server-only successor to Cascade Lake, using 10 nm process, released in April 2021
 Cypress Cove Backport of Sunny Cove to Intel's 14nm process
 Rocket Lake: Successor to Comet Lake, using Intel's 14++ nm process, released on March 30, 2021
 Willow CoveSuccessor to the Sunny Cove core, includes new security features and redesigns the cache subsystem.
 Tiger Lake: successor to Ice Lake, using Intel's 10 nm SuperFin (10SF) process, released in Q4 2020
 Golden CoveSuccessor to the Willow Cove core, includes improvements to performance and power efficiency. Also includes new instructions.
 Alder Lake: hybrid processor, succeeds Rocket Lake and Tiger Lake; uses Intel 7 process (previously known as 10ESF), released on November 4, 2021. Golden Cove is used in P-cores of Alder Lake processors.
 Sapphire Rapids: server and workstation-only, successor to Ice Lake-SP, manufactured on Intel 7 process, released on January 10, 2023. Introduces AMX.
 Raptor CoveA refresh of Golden Cove with increased L2 and L3 caches and core clocks.
 Raptor Lake: successor to Alder Lake with increased cache sizes, core clocks and the number of E-cores, released on October 20, 2022. Manufactured using Intel 7 process. Raptor Cove is used in the P-cores while the E-cores are still implemented using Gracemont microarchitecture.

x86 ULV (Atom) 

Bonnell
 45 nm, low-power, in-order microarchitecture for use in Atom processors.
 Saltwell: 32 nm shrink of the Bonnell microarchitecture.

Silvermont
 22 nm, out-of-order microarchitecture for use in Atom processors, released on May 6, 2013.
 Airmont: 14 nm shrink of the Silvermont microarchitecture.

Goldmont
 14 nm Atom microarchitecture iteration after Silvermont but borrows heavily from Skylake processors (e.g., GPU), released in April 2016.
 Goldmont Plus: successor to Goldmont microarchitecture, still based on the 14 nm process, released on December 11, 2017.

 Tremont10 nm Atom microarchitecture iteration after Goldmont Plus.
 Lakefield: mobile-only, Intel's first hybrid processor, released in June 2020. Tremont is used in efficiency cores (E-cores) of Lakefield processors.
 Jasper Lake: Celeron and Pentium Silver desktop and mobile processors, released in Q1 2021.
 Elkhart Lake: embedded processors targeted at IoT, released in Q1 2021.

Gracemont
Intel 7 process Atom microarchitecture iteration after Tremont. First Atom class core with AVX and AVX2 support.
 Alder Lake: hybrid processor, succeeds Rocket Lake and Tiger Lake, released on November 4, 2021. Gracemont is used in E-cores of Alder Lake processors.
 Raptor Lake: a refresh of Alder Lake, released on October 20, 2022.

Other microarchitectures

IA-64 (Itanium) 
 Merced original Itanium microarchitecture.  Used only in the first Itanium microprocessors.
 McKinley enhanced microarchitecture used in the first two generations of the Itanium 2 microprocessor. Madison is the 130nm version.
 Montecito enhanced McKinley microarchitecture used in the Itanium 2 9000- and 9100-series of processors.  Added dual core, coarse multithreading, and other improvements. The Montvale update added demand-based switching (SpeedStep) and core-level lockstep execution.
 Tukwila enhanced microarchitecture used in the Itanium 9300 series of processors. Added quad core, an integrated memory controller, QuickPath Interconnect, and other improvements e.g. a more active SoEMT.
 Poulson Itanium processor featuring an all-new microarchitecture. 8 cores, decoupling in pipeline and in multithreading. 12-wide issue with partial out-of-order execution.
 Kittson the last Itanium. It has the same microarchitecture as Poulson, but slightly higher clock speed for the top two models.

Miscellaneous 

XScale
 a microarchitecture implementing the ARM architecture instruction set.
Larrabee (cancelled 2010)
 multi-core in-order x86-64 updated version of P5 microarchitecture, with wide SIMD vector units and texture sampling hardware for use in graphics. Cores derived from this microarchitecture are called MIC (Many Integrated Core).

Roadmap

Pentium 4 / Core lines

Atom lines

See also 
 List of Intel processors - Consumer Computer or non-consumer workstation
 List of AMD CPU microarchitectures
 Marvell Technology Group XScale microarchitecture
 Transient execution CPU vulnerability

References

External links 
 Intel Automated Relational Knowledgebase

Intel microprocessors
Intel CPU microarchitectures
Intel microarchitectures